The 72nd Division was created in February 1949 under the Regulation of the Redesignations of All Organizations and Units of the Army, issued by Central Military Commission on November 1, 1948, basing on the 18th Division, 6th Column of the Huadong Field Army. Its history can be traced to the 1st Brigade of Suzhong Military District, formed in August 1945.

The division was part of the 24th Corps. Under the flag of the 72nd Division, it took part in several major battles in the Chinese Civil War, including the Huaihai Campaign. 

The division was composed of 214th, 215th, and 216th Regiments.

In August 1952, Artillery Regiment, 200th Division was activated, which was later renamed as the 351st Artillery Regiment in 1953. The division then entered Korea with the Corps HQ as a part of People's Volunteer Army. During its deployment in Korea, it took part in the defensive actions in Triangle Hill and Kumsong area.

Zhang Taofang, a soldier from 214th Regiment, claimed 214 confirmed kills with 442 shots in his 32-day deployment with a rifle without the scope.

In 1954 the division pulled out from North Korea and garrisoned in Tangshan, Hebei.

By then the division was composed of:
214th Regiment
215th Regiment
216th Regiment
351th Artillery Regiment

In June 1969, 351th Artillery Regiment was renamed the Artillery Regiment, 72nd Army Division.

In September 1985 the division was reconstituted as a northern infantry division, category B.

In June 1999, the division was merged with the Reserve Artillery Division of Tangshan() and reorganized as the  72nd Reserve Artillery Division of Hebei Provincial Military District(), and was transferred to the Hebei PMD's control. 

The division was then composed of:
214th Artillery Regiment
215th Artillery Regiment
216th Artillery Regiment

References

中国人民解放军各步兵师沿革, http://blog.sina.com.cn/s/blog_a3f74a990101cp1q.html

72
Infantry divisions of the People's Volunteer Army
Military units and formations established in 1949
Reserve divisions of the People's Liberation Army